The women's 1000 metres race of the 2014–15 ISU Speed Skating World Cup 1, arranged in the Meiji Hokkaido-Tokachi Oval, in Obihiro, Japan, was held on 15 November 2014.

Marrit Leenstra of the Netherlands won, followed by Ireen Wüst of the Netherlands in second place, and Li Qishi of China in third place. Vanessa Bittner of Austria won Division B.

Results
The race took place on Saturday, 15 November, with Division B scheduled in the morning session, at 12:25, and Division A scheduled in the afternoon session, at 15:00.

Division A

Division B

References

Women 1000
1